The following highways are numbered 72A:

India
National Highway 72A (India)

United States
 County Road 72A (Sarasota County, Florida)
 New York State Route 72A (former)

See also
 List of highways numbered 72